The Aguayo Family Homestead, near Nogal, New Mexico, was listed on the National Register of Historic Places in 1995.

It is located on Tortolita Creek, in Tortolita Canyon, west of Nogal.  The listing included one contributing building, five contributing structures, and two contributing sites.

The house is a single-story, L-shaped adobe building built around 1917.  The family had first lived in a log building which was later used as a barn.

References

		
National Register of Historic Places in Lincoln County, New Mexico
Buildings and structures completed in 1917